Rick Leonardi (born August 9, 1957) is an American comics artist who has worked on various series for Marvel Comics and DC Comics, including Cloak and Dagger, The Uncanny X-Men, The New Mutants, Spider-Man 2099, Nightwing, Batgirl, Green Lantern Versus Aliens and Superman. He has worked on feature film tie-in comics such as Star Wars: General Grievous and Superman Returns Prequel #3.

Early life 
Rick Leonardi was born August 9, 1957 in Philadelphia, and grew up in Haverhill, Massachusetts.

Leonardi's interest in becoming an artist was inspired by the work of Joe Kubert, which he discovered in the second grade when he read Star Spangled War Stories #139 (July 1968). Leonardi commented in a 2017 interview, "Top of page 8 is still one of the best-designed panels I've ever seen."

Leonardi graduated from Dartmouth College in 1979, and started drawing for Marvel Comics the following year.

Career 
Rick Leonardi's first published comics artwork appeared in Thor #303 (Jan. 1981). He collaborated with writer Bill Mantlo on two limited series: The Vision and the Scarlet Witch (Nov. 1982–Feb. 1983) and Cloak and Dagger (Oct. 1983–Jan. 1984). Leonardi's works in the 1980s include various fill-in issues of The Uncanny X-Men  and The New Mutants.

He is credited, along with fellow illustrator Mike Zeck, of designing the black-and-white costume to which Spider-Man switched during the 1984 Secret Wars miniseries, and later wore for a time. According to writer Peter David, the costume began as a design by Zeck that Leonardi embellished. The plot that developed as a result of Spider-Man's acquisition of the costume led to the creation of the Spider-Man villain known as Venom although in a 2007 Comic Book Resources story, fan Randy Schueller claims to have devised a version of a black costume for Spider-Man in a story idea that he was paid for. Leonardi and writer Tom DeFalco created the Rose in The Amazing Spider-Man #253 (June 1984). For DC Comics, Leonardi was one of the artists on Batman #400 (Oct. 1986) and he drew the Batgirl story in Secret Origins vol. 2 #20 (Nov. 1987). Back at Marvel, Chris Claremont and Leonardi introduced the fictional country of Genosha in Uncanny X-Men #235 (Oct. 1988). From 1992 to 1994, Leonardi was the regular penciler for the first 25 issues of Spider-Man 2099 with writer Peter David. Leonardi later launched the Fantastic Four 2099 series with Karl Kesel. Leonardi drew the 2000 intercompany crossover miniseries Green Lantern Versus Aliens. He drew one of the tie-in one-shots for the Sentry limited series in 2001.

His subsequent series work includes Nightwing, on which he was the regular penciler for issues #71-84 from 2002 to 2003 and Batgirl, of which he drew issues #45–52 from 2003 to 2004. Subsequent miniseries he drew include Star Wars: General Grievous in 2005, and the 2006 movie tie-in, Superman Returns Prequel #3. He followed up that with other superhero titles such as Superman #665 and #668 (2007), JLA: Classified #43 (November 2007), Witchblade #112 (January 2008), and the 2008 miniseries DC Universe: Decisions. Leonardi drew the Vigilante series that debuted from DC in December 2008.

Leonardi and inker Ande Parks are the illustrators on the 2019 Batman Beyond arc written by Dan Jurgens which debuted with issue #31 in April 2019. Although Leonardi had worked on Batman before, this assignment is his first time working on the future-based Batman Beyond, whose concept is similar to Spider-Man 2099, which Leonardi co-created.

Bibliography

Dark Horse Comics 
Dark Horse Comics #1–2 (1992)
Green Lantern Versus Aliens #1–4 (2000)
Star Wars #8, 10 (1999)
Star Wars: Darth Vader and the Lost Command #1–5 (2011)
Star Wars: General Grievous #1–4 (2005)
Star Wars Tales #3, 9 (2000–2001)

DC Comics 

Adam Strange Special #1 (2008)
Astro City vol. 3 #44 (2017)
Batgirl #45–47, 49–50, 52, 54 (2003–2004)
Batman #400 (1986)
Batman Beyond vol. 6 #31–36 (2019)
Birds of Prey #39–41 (2002)
Booster Gold vol. 2 #47 (2011)
Booster Gold / The Flintstones Special #1 (2017)
Convergence Batgirl #1–2 (2015)
Convergence Batman: Shadow of the Bat #2 (2015)
DC Universe: Decisions #1, 3 (2008)
Fables #113 (2012)
The Flintstones #7 (2017)
Green Lantern/Huckleberry Hound Special #1 (2018)
JLA: Classified #42–46 (2007–2008)
Justice League Giant #1 (2018)
Legion of Super-Heroes vol. 5 #47 (2008)
Legion Worlds #4 (2001)
New Teen Titans vol. 2 #22 (1986)
Nightwing #57, 59, 71–75, 78–81, 83–84 (2001–2003)
Nightwing: Our Worlds at War #1 (2001)
Sandman Special #1 (2017)
Scooby Apocalypse #17 (2017)
Secret Origins vol. 2 #20 (Batgirl) (1987)
Showcase '96 #7 (1996)
Sovereign Seven Annual #2 (1996)
Suicide Squad vol. 3 #23 (2013)
Supergirl vol. 5 #27 (2008)
Superman #665, 668–670, 712 (2007–2011)
Superman Returns Prequel #3 (2006)
Vigilante vol. 2 #1–4, 7–10, 12 (2009–2010)
Who's Who: The Definitive Directory of the DC Universe #14 (1986)
Who's Who: Update '87 #1 (1987)

Event Comics 
Painkiller Jane #1–5 (1997)
Painkiller Jane/Hellboy #1 (1998)

Marvel Comics 

The Amazing Spider-Man # 228, 253–254, 279, 282 (1982–1986)
Cable/Machine Man '98 #1 (1998)
Classic X-Men #37 (1989)
Cloak and Dagger #1–4 (1983)
Cloak and Dagger vol. 2 #1–4, 6 (1985–1986)
Cloak and Dagger vol. 3 #12–16 (1990–1991)
Daredevil #248–249, 277 (1987–1990)
Excalibur #19 (1990)
Excalibur: Air Apparent #1 (1992)
Excalibur: XX Crossing #1 (1992)
Fantastic Four 2099 #1 (1996)
Generation X #24 (1997)
Giant-Size X-Men #4 (2005)
Impossible Man #2 (1991)
The Incredible Hulk Annual #10 (1981)
Marvel Comics Presents #10–17 (Colossus); #101–106 (Ghost Rider/Doctor Strange) (1989–1992)
Marvel Fanfare #14, 19 (1984–1985)
Marvel Holiday Special #4–5 (1995–1997)
New Mutants #38, 52–53, 78 (1986–1989)
New Thunderbolts #96–97 (2006)
Phoenix Resurrection: Revelations #1 (1995)
The Rampaging Hulk vol. 2 #1–3, 5–6 (1998–1999)
Sentry/Spider-Man #1 (2001)
Sleepwalker #4 (1991)
The Spectacular Spider-Man # 52, 71 (1981–1982)
Spider-Man #17 (1991)
Spider-Man 2099 #1–8, 10–13, 15–17, 19–20, 22–25 (1992–1994)
Spider-Man/Spider-Man 2099 #1 (1996)
Tales of the Marvel Universe #1 (1997)
Thor #303, 309 (1981)
Uncanny X-Men #201, 212, 228, 231, 235, 237, 252 (1986–1989)
The Vision and the Scarlet Witch #1–4 (1982–1983)
Warlock and the Infinity Watch #3–4 (1992)
X-Man #31 (1997)
X-Men '99 Annual #1 (1999)
X-Men: True Friends #1–3 (1999)

New Paradigm Studios 
Watson and Holmes #1 (2013)

References

External links 

Rick Leonardi at Mike's Amazing World of Comics
Rick Leonardi at the Unofficial Handbook of Marvel Comics Creators

1957 births
20th-century American artists
21st-century American artists
American comics artists
Artists from Philadelphia
Dartmouth College alumni
DC Comics people
Living people
Marvel Comics people
People from Haverhill, Massachusetts